Live On The Green (LOTG) is a free outdoor music festival in Nashville, Tennessee produced and presented by local radio station WRLT Lightning 100 that showcases the city’s emerging musical talent and highlights well-known national acts. Since its first year in 2009, it has been held at Public Square Park in downtown Nashville adjacent to the historic Metropolitan Courthouse and attracts over 600,000 fans from all 50 states and 15 countries. It has been held every year except 2020 and 2021 when it was cancelled during the COVID-19 pandemic, in which the radio station instead hosted live performances and interviews with the artists. The festival hosts two stages showcasing the city’s emerging musical talent and highlights well-known national acts, and also includes food trucks, vendors, and a VIP experience.

After a two year hiatus due to the pandemic, Live on the Green is back! On June 15, 2022, Lightning 100 announced the festival will return Sept. 1- 5 at Public Square Park. 

The festival has been ranked by local magazine the Nashville Scene as Best Event/Festival, Best Concert Series, Best Free Fun, Best Radio Station, and Best Cheap Date.

History 
Live On The Green was founded in 2009 by local radio station WRLT Lighting 100 as a celebration of music and community and has always been free to the public. Before LOTG, Nashville hosted free concert series such as Dancin in the District, Uptown Mix, and Summer Lights that didn’t quite succeed. The event was initially intended as an opportunity for up-and-coming local Nashville artists to build a fanbase, but the concert series didn’t receive much attention or profits in its early years. The radio station then began overlapping their programming with bands they booked for the festival, drawing in more crowds.

In 2012, Alabama Shakes took to the Main Stage and marked a turning point for the festival, doubling the average attendance in one night. Spoon then set the overall attendance record with what was estimated to be 20,000 fans in 2017. Now, Live On The Green draws in 100,000 fans each year and has expanded its footprint past Public Square Park and up Deaderick Street and 3rd Avenue, adding a second stage in 2015 called the “615 Stage” that hosts several local artists from in and around the Nashville area. The festival also features a local artist each year through an annual battle of the bands called Music City Mayhem. Since its inception, Live On The Green has grown into a music industry force that draws thousands of fans, brings in millions of dollars into the downtown economy, and even influences album release strategies for many artists and labels.

About Lightning 100 
Locally owned and operated for 30 years, Lightning 100.1 FM, Nashville's independent radio, has maintained an unwavering dedication to the city through its unique on-air programming and live events. The format of this award winning radio station affords it a wider range of music genres with a focus on local, emerging, and national artists. Lightning 100 is the proud founder of the Live On The Green Music Festival.

Community 
Lightning 100 has donated profits from the Live On The Green music festival to donorschoose.org which fully funded 35 projects, directly impacting nearly 5,000 students from high poverty Nashville schools. LOTG also raises awareness on important issues and invites select organizations to share messages and engage fans in positive ways at the festival. Live On The Green itself is also pet and children friendly.

Sustainability 
Live On The Green focuses heavily on eco-friendly solutions regarding the site and community. 54% of all waste generated at the festival is recycled each year, totaling to 79,680 lbs of material recycled since the concert series began in 2009. The Lightning 100 studio itself is a leading non-restaurant composter with Compost Nashville and the festival strives to be completely waste free in all upcoming seasons. In addition, all LOTG merchandise is made locally at the Friendly Arctic printmaking studio with high-quality eco-friendly materials and inks, and all t-shirts are 100% cotton.

LOTG also promotes biking, walking, taking public transportation, or carpooling to the festival. Partners at Walk/Bike Nashville offer a complimentary bike valet check at the festival, checking over 1,000 bikes for fans. There are also designated Lyft rideshare pick-up and drop-off locations on Deaderick Street and 4th Avenue and on James Robertson Pikeway.

Notable performances 

The festival has hosted more than 200 performing artists, including Ben Harper & the Innocent Criminals, Alabama Shakes, Spoon, Gary Clark Jr., Cage the Elephant, Sheryl Crow, Passion Pit, Portugal. The Man, Ben Folds, The Head and the Heart, Lord Huron, BØRNS, Rodrigo y Gabriela, Band of Horses, Cold War Kids, City and Colour, Young the Giant, Matt and Kim, Michael Franti & Spearhead, Matt Nathanson, Ingrid Michaelson, The Wallflowers, Citizen Cope and many more.

2020 Line-up 
In 2020 Live On The Green shifted to an on-air format due to COVID-19. The Live On My Green FM Music Festival ran from September 3, 2020 to September 7, 2020 on 100.1 FM in Nashville. The event consisted of over 100 acts over five days and included pre-taped festival performances and exclusive content. The 2020 lineup included Bruce Springsteen, Metallica, My Morning Jacket, Jason Isbell, Beck, Sheryl Crow, and Moon Taxi, among many others.

Past dates and artists

2022 
The 2022 festival was the first in-person festival since 2019 and took place over Labor Day weekend, September 1-5, 2022.

2020 
The 2020 season shifted to an on-air radio format, the "Live On My Green FM Music Festival," from September 3–6, 2020.

2019 
The 2019 season started with two consecutive Thursdays from August 15–22, 2019 and ended with a weekend finale on August 29 - September 1, 2019.

2018 
The 2018 season started with three consecutive Thursdays from August 9–23, 2018 and ended with a weekend finale on August 30 - September 1, 2018.

2017 
The 2017 season started with three consecutive Thursdays from August 10–24, 2017 and ended with a weekend finale on August 31 - September 2, 2017.

2016 
The 2016 season started with three consecutive Thursdays from August 11–25, 2016 and ended with a weekend finale from September 1–3, 2016.

2015 
The 2015 season started with three consecutive Thursdays from August 20 - September 3, 2015 and ended with a weekend finale from September 10–12, 2015.

2014 
The 2014 season started with three consecutive Thursdays from August 14–28, 2014 and ended with a weekend finale from September 4–6, 2014.

2013
The 2013 season consisted of six consecutive Thursdays from August 8 - September 12, 2013.

2012
The 2012 season consisted of six consecutive Thursdays from September 6 - October 11, 2012.

2011
The 2011 season consisted of six consecutive Thursdays from September 8 - October 13, 2011.

2010

2009

References

External links
 

Concerts in the United States
Events in Nashville, Tennessee
Music festivals in Tennessee
Annual events in Tennessee
Music festivals established in 2009
2009 establishments in Tennessee